Hose is a surname originating from England. It is a topographical name from the Middle English, "hose", "huse" meaning "brambles", "thorns". Derived from Old English "hos", plural of "hoh" meaning "spur of the land" (literally "heel"), a habitational name from a place in Leicestershire.

Notable people with the surname include:

Brutil Hose (born 1979), soccer player
Charles Hose (1863–1929), British ethnologist
Henry Hose
Josh Hose (born 1986), Australian wheelchair rugby player
Sam Hose, African American worker lynched in 1899
Simon Hose (born 1967), Australian rules footballer

References